The yellow mantella or eastern mantella (Mantella crocea) is a species of frog in the family Mantellidae.
It is endemic to Madagascar.
Its natural habitats are subtropical or tropical moist lowland forests, subtropical or tropical swamps, and swamps.
It is threatened by habitat loss. Commercial collection may also be a threat.

References

Mantella
Amphibians described in 1990
Endemic frogs of Madagascar
Species endangered by the pet trade
Taxonomy articles created by Polbot